Kinyongia tenuis, also known as the Usambara soft-horned chameleon, Usambara flap-nosed chameleon, and Matschie's dwarf chameleon is a  species of chameleon.

Distribution
This species has been recorded in Tanzania's Afrotemperate forests in east Usambara Mountains and Magrotto Hill. In Kenya, it is only known as a subpopulation in the Shimba Hills, however genetic analysis needs to confirm this.

References

Kinyongia
Lizards of Africa
Reptiles of Kenya
Reptiles of Tanzania
Reptiles described in 1892
Taxa named by Paul Matschie